Nadim Mostafa is a Bangladesh Nationalist Party politician and the former Member of Parliament of Rajshahi-4. He was a close associate of Tarique Rahman, son of Ziaur Rahman and Khaleda Zia.

Career
Mostafa was elected to parliament from Rajshahi-4 as a Bangladesh Nationalist Party candidate in 1996 and 2001. He is the special secretary of Bangladesh Nationalist Party.

Nadim went into hiding in early 2007 during the 2006–2008 Bangladeshi political crisis. On 3 July 2007, Nadim was sentenced to five years imprisonment for extortion.

Charges were framed against him on 24 April 2007 for supporting militants. A victim of Jamaat-ul-Mujahideen Bangladesh filed the case against Nadim, Ruhul Kuddus Talukder Dulu, and Aminul Haque were charged in the case of abetting the Islamic militant organisation. In July 2007, Nadim was acquitted in the case over the embezzlement of Corrugated galvanised iron sheets from government relief fund. On 15 August 2007, Nadim was sentenced to ten years imprisonment on an extortion case. He was alleged to have tried to extort Molla Hasan Imam Faruk, Maria Union Parishad chairperson ahead of elections. On 25 September 2007, two other cases were filed against him, one for extortion and another for abetting militants.

The Daily Star reported on 3 August 2008 that Nadim, along with Ruhul Kuddus Talukder Dulu, Mizanur Rahman Minu, and Alamgir Kabir, used state resources during the Bangladesh Nationalist Party government to finance militants such as Jamaat-ul-Mujahideen Bangladesh in Rajshahi. Anti-Corruption Commission pressed charges against him for allegedly possessing 28.6 million taka in illegal wealth on 11 November 2008. The name of his wife, Nurunnahar Parul, was dropped from the charge sheet as no evidence was found against her during the investigation.

On 13 May 2009, Nadim surrendered before a Rajshahi court and was sent to jail by Judge Lutfa Begum. Nadim secured bail from a bench of Bangladesh High Court on 5 June 2009. On 14 July 2009, a victim of Bangla Bhai sued Nadim for allegedly supporting the terrorist in 2004.

On 22 March 2011, supporters of Nadim clashed with activists of Awami League in Rajshahi. In April 2011, an investigation commission found that he was involved in the repression of religious minorities during 2001 Bangladesh post-election violence.

On 30 April 2012, Nadim participated in a countrywide strike called by Bangladesh Nationalist Party in which 10 people were injured in Rajshahi. Mizanur Rahman Minu, Joint Secretary of Rajshahi District unit of Bangladesh Nationalist Party, burned Nadim's effigies while allegeding that Nadim's supporters dominated all committees of Bangladesh Nationalist Party in the district on 19 December 2012. Nadim is the President of Rajshahi District unit of Bangladesh Nationalist Party.

Nadim was injured while participating in a hartal, strike, in Rajshahi on 23 April 2013. It was the first day of a 36-hour countrywide strike called by Bangladesh Nationalist Party. On 29 September 2013, Nadim was sued along with 89 others for their involvement in the death of Constable Siddhartha Chandra Sarkar. On 26 December 2012, Siddhartha Chandra Sarkar was killed and eight other police officers were injured in a bomb attack on a police van by Bangladesh Nationalist Party activists during a strike.

Nadim was nominated by Bangladesh Nationalist Party to contest the 2018 general election from Rajshahi-5. Bangladesh Nationalist Party originally nominated Professor Nazrul Islam and then later gave the nomination to Nadim. Bangladesh High Court in a verdict disallowed him from participating in the election.

References

Bangladesh Nationalist Party politicians
Living people
6th Jatiya Sangsad members
7th Jatiya Sangsad members
8th Jatiya Sangsad members
People from Rajshahi District
Year of birth missing (living people)